The 1976 Nobel Prize in Literature was awarded to Canadian-American novelist Saul Bellow (1915–2005) "for the human understanding and subtle analysis of contemporary culture that are combined in his work". He is the sixth American recipient of the prize after John Steinbeck in 1962.

Laureate

Bellow made his debut with the novel Dangling Man in 1944, but his literary breakthrough came in 1953 with The Adventures of Augie March. Considered one of the innovators of the American novel, he gained wider readership with Herzog (1964), Mr. Sammler's Planet (1970), and Humboldt's Gift (1975). His themes include the disorientation of contemporary society, and the ability of people to overcome their frailty and achieve greatness or awareness. Bellow saw many flaws in modern civilization, and its ability to foster madness, materialism and misleading knowledge. Often his characters are Jewish and have a sense of alienation or otherness. He won a Pulitzer Prize in 1976 and the only writer to win the National Book Award for Fiction three times.

References

External links
1976 Press release nobelprize.org

1976